Nader Batmanghelidj (1904–1998) was an Iranian military officer who served in various military and government posts. He also served as the ambassador of Imperial Iran to Pakistan and Iraq.

Early life and education
Batmanghelidj was born in 1904. One of his brothers, Haj Mehdi Batmanghelidj, was a landowner. 

He was a graduate of the Iranian Military Academy and joined the Iranian Army in the 1920s. He attended military courses in both Germany and Czechoslovakia.

Career
During the invasion of Iran by the British in World War II Batmanghelidj was serving in the army as a colonel and was captured and imprisoned by the British in 1941. He was in prison until the end of the war. Following his release Batmanghelidj became a brigadier general and participated in the liberation forces of Azerbaijan against the Soviet occupation.

Batmanghelidj was appointed head of the military office of Shah Mohammad Reza Pahlavi. He was named as the chief of the athletic program by Prime Minister Mohammad Mosaddegh. He was one of the senior military officers who were planning a coup against the Mosaddegh government. On 15 August 1953 Batmanghelidj was arrested and imprisoned when the coup failed. 

When Mossadegh was overthrown in August 1953 Batmanghelidj returned to the army. He was the chief of staff of the armed forces between 1953 and 1955. Although not assigned by the government, Batmanghelidj and Teymur Bakhtiar, military-governor of Tehran, participated in the destruction of the National Baha'i Center in Tehran on 22 May 1955. They took part in the destruction of the building along with the religious leaders. Batmanghelidj became the first Iranian ambassador to Pakistan when he was appointed to the post in 1955 which he held until 1957. His appointment was possible through his closeness to retired military officer, Fazlollah Zahedi, who played a significant role in the coup against Mohammad Mossadegh.

Next Batmanghelidj served as the ambassador of Iran to Iraq in the period 1957–1958. He was appointed minister of interior to the cabinet led by Prime Minister Manouchehr Eghbal in 1958 and was in office until 1959. When he was in office he successfully developed a rural development plan. Batmanghelidj was succeeded by Rahmat Allah Atabaki in the post who finalized his rural development project. Batmanghelidj was the chairman of the military group of the Central Treaty Organization (CENTO) in the 1960s. His last public post was the governor general of Khorasan Province for three years in the period 1964–1967, and he retired in 1967.

Personal life and death
Batmanghelidj was the owner of Tehran International Hotel which he established in the 1940s. He was arrested following the 1979 revolution in Iran. He was imprisoned for three years and went to the United States when he was released from the prison. There he first settled in Herndon, Virginia, and then in Washington DC. He married twice. His first wife, Mahin Banu Mirfendereski, died in 1974. He then married Nayer Moluk Sadoughi. He had three children from his first marriage. 

Batmanghelidj died of kidney failure at the Cameron Glen Care Center in Reston, Virginia, on 24 April 1998.

Honors
Batmanghelidj was awarded the Order of Sepah and Legion of Merit both of which were from the Imperial Iran.

References

External links

20th-century Iranian diplomats
20th-century Iranian businesspeople
1904 births
1998 deaths
Ambassadors of Iran to Iraq
Ambassadors of Iran to Pakistan
Exiles of the Iranian Revolution in the United States
Hotel founders
Interior Ministers of Iran
Imperial Iranian Army lieutenant generals
Iranian prisoners and detainees
Iranian governors
People of Pahlavi Iran
Deaths from kidney failure